Renate Jansen (born 7 December 1990) is a Dutch professional footballer who plays as a striker for Eredivisie club Twente and the Netherlands national team.

Club career
Her career started at youth teams of SV Abbenes in her native Abbenes. In 2005, she started to play in the B1 (boys team) of VV Kagia in Lisserbroek. In 2007 she left the club and joined Ter Leede, later joining HvA.

In the summer of 2008 she signed with ADO Den Haag of the Eredivisie. In the 2011–12 season she won the double (League and Cup) with the club. Some changes were made in the 2012–13 season, a new league (BeNe League) with clubs from Belgium and the Netherlands was created replacing the national leagues of both countries. In the same season she scored on her UEFA Women's Champions League debut match against Rossiyanka.

On 19 April 2014, she played her 150th official match for ADO (131 league, 16 cup, 2 Champions League and 1 BeNe Super Cup) against FC Twente; since her club debut on 21 August 2008 she had missed just three matches and scored 87 goals (71 league, 15 cup and 1 Champions League).

After seven seasons at ADO, where she scored 109 goals in 181 games in all competitions, she joined FC Twente in the summer of 2015. She won the league title in 2015–16 at her first season with FC Twente.

International career
Jansen made her debut for the Dutch national team on 1 April 2010 against Slovakia. She was part of training camps with the national team and played in friendlies until 2017 when she was included in the squad for the 2017 Algarve Cup with her big break into a major tournament coming soon after as she was selected for the UEFA Women's Euro 2017, where she played four matches coming in as a substitute in the tournament won by the Dutch.

International goals
Scores and results list the Netherlands goal tally first.

Honours

Clubs
ADO Den Haag
 Eredivisie (1): 2011–12
 Dutch Cup (2): 2011–12, 2012–13

FC Twente
 Eredivisie (4): 2015–16, 2018–19, 2020–21, 2021-22,

International
Netherlands
 UEFA Women's Euro (1): 2017
Algarve Cup: 2018

References

External links
 Profile  at Onsoranje.nl
 Profile  at onsoranje.nl
 Profile at Soccerway

1990 births
Living people
People from Haarlemmermeer
Dutch women's footballers
Netherlands women's international footballers
Eredivisie (women) players
FC Twente (women) players
ADO Den Haag (women) players
UEFA Women's Championship-winning players
Knights of the Order of Orange-Nassau
Women's association football forwards
2019 FIFA Women's World Cup players
Ter Leede players
Footballers at the 2020 Summer Olympics
Olympic footballers of the Netherlands
UEFA Women's Euro 2022 players
Footballers from North Holland
20th-century Dutch women
21st-century Dutch women
UEFA Women's Euro 2017 players